Abdallah ibn Tahir (ca. 798–844/5) was a military leader and the Tahirid governor of Khurasan from 828 until his death. He is perhaps the most famous of the Tahirids. His career spanned twenty-five years under three caliphs, al-Ma'mun, al-Mu'tasim, and al-Wathiq. Militarily, he is known for defeating the powerful rebels Nasr ibn Shabath in the Jazira (Upper Mesopotamia) and Ubaydallah ibn al-Sari in Egypt.

Early life 
Abdallah's early career consisted of serving with his father Tahir ibn Husayn in pacifying the lands of the Abbasid Caliphate following the civil war between al-Amin and al-Ma'mun. He later succeeded his father as governor of al-Jazira, with the task of defeating the rebel Nasr ibn Shabath, and between 824 and 826 convinced Nasr to surrender. He was then sent to Egypt, where he successfully ended an uprising led by 'Abd-Allah ibn al-Sari. He also recovered Alexandria, which had been seized by Andalusian Muslim refugees seven years before; following their expulsion, the refugees headed to Byzantine Crete, establishing Muslim rule there for the first time.

Governorship 
Although Abdallah had been made the governor of Khurasan following his brother's death in 828, he only arrived in Nishapur in 830; in the meantime he had been busy fighting more revolts. He was assigned for a brief time in 829 to stop the Khurramite Babak, but then was given new orders by the caliph to move to Khurasan and stop the Kharijites. Abdallah's brother 'Ali acted as deputy governor of Khurasan until he was ready to take up residence in Nishapur.

During his reign as governor Abdallah was occupied with affairs on both the eastern and western parts of his territories. In the east, he took steps to improve the strength of the Samanids, his vassals in Transoxiana. The Samanids were important, as they controlled the trade between Central Asia and the central Caliphate, including the trade in Turkic slaves. Also in the east, in 834, an Alid, Muhammad ibn al-Qasim, revolted in Juzjan, but Abdallah's forces eventually managed to capture him.

In the west, meanwhile, Abdallah came into conflict with the local ruler of Tabaristan, the Ispahbadh Mazyar. As the ruler of the east, Abdallah claimed Tabaristan as a dependency and insisted that the tribute owed by Mazyar to the caliph should pass through him. Mazyar, however, was looking to expand his dominion and wanted to be free of Tahirid influence, so he refused to accept this and demanded that he be able to pay his tribute directly to the caliph. In this struggle Mazyar had the support of the Afshin, who allegedly wanted to control the Tahirid lands himself. Abdallah was able to turn the caliph against Mazyar, and in 839 was ordered to stop the Ispahbad. Mazyar, a recent convert to Islam, heavily relied on the Zoroastrians of the province but in the end was captured, sent to Iraq and executed. Tahirid control over Tabaristan was therefore secured until the Zaydid revolt of 864. During the same year in 839, an earthquake occurred in Farghana, destroying much of the city.

Abdallah died in Nishapur, either at the end of 844 or in 845. He was succeeded by his son Tahir. According to the famous Seljuq vizier Nizam al-Mulk, Abdallah was buried in Nishapur, where his tomb became a pilgrimage site.

References

Sources

Further reading
 

798 births
840s deaths
9th-century Abbasid governors of Egypt
Tahirid governors of Khurasan
9th-century rulers in Asia
Generals of the Abbasid Caliphate
Amirs of Nishapur
9th-century Iranian people